Nizhnyaya Omka is a rural locality (a selo) and the administrative center of Nizhneomsky District, Omsk Oblast, Russia. Population:

References

Notes

Sources

Rural localities in Omsk Oblast